Pam Hogg (4 January) is a Scottish fashion designer who launched her first fashion collection in 1981. She has created clothes for the likes of Ian Astbury of The Cult, Paula Yates, Marie Helvin, Siouxsie Sioux and Debbie Harry of Blondie.

Early life
She was born in Paisley, near Glasgow, Scotland. After her studies of Fine Art and Printed Textiles at the Glasgow School of Art, she won the Newbury Medal of Distinction, the Frank Warner Memorial Medal, the Leverhulme Scholarship and the Royal Society of Arts Bursary, she subsequently went on to further study at the Royal College of Art in London, where she gained her Master of Arts degree. 

Interested in music she joined her first band 'Rubbish' at the end of the seventies regularly supporting The Pogues in their infancy.

Fashion career
Pam Hogg launched her first fashion collection in 1981 while still just in her 20s. She was, along with Bodymap, one of the new wave of designers who emerged at the beginning of the 1980s in London. Hogg first sold her designs at Hyper Hyper at Kensington Market and later from her own shop in London's West-end always refusing to 'sell out' to the mainstream fashion industry. Her collections bore names such as Psychedelic Jungle (1981), Warrior Queen (1989), Best Dressed Chicken in Town, And God Created Woman and Wild Wild Women of the West.

She had a minor hit with Britain's first acid house band, The Garden of Eden, with  Kiss FM DJ Steve Jackson, vocalist Angela McCluskey and record producer Mark Tinley.

Her solo show at the Kelvingrove Art Galleries in 1990, was the first fashion design exhibition to be held there and was well attended. In 1991, Terry Wogan introduced her onto his TV show as "one of the most original, inventive, creative designers in Britain" adding, "She has reached what is called Cult Status".

In the same year a brief appearance on stage in Nashville with industrial noise band Pigface reaffirmed her love of performing, resulting in her shifting focus back to writing music full-time.

Unexpectedly landing the support act with Debbie Harry in 1993, she formed new band 'Doll' in five days, and in 1994 with the band firmly established, opened for the post punk band The Raincoats.

Between 1999 and 2001, her continued love of designing and making clothes resulted in two catwalk collections and her first fashion film Accelerator starring Anita Pallenberg, Bobby Gillespie and Patti Palladin. She also clinched cameo roles from Daryl Hannah, David Soul and Primal Scream towards the end of 2002, having discovered a latent talent for script writing and directing.

In 2003 Hogg was approached by Jarvis Cocker collaborator Jason Buckle to form a "Cramps like band" which would become known as Hoggdoll. Using his swamp like Rockabilly sounds as a backdrop she wrote and recorded 6 tracks in as many weeks and built up an underground following across the globe. Her unexpectedly tender song 'Honeyland' touched a nerve and eventually surfaced on the Berlin-based Art Riot band Chicks on Speed 'Girlmonster' compilation in 2006.

Inspired by Siouxsie Sioux's Japanese concept, she designed the costumes for her 2004 world tour Dreamshow.

In 2006, the Spanish curator Xavier Arakistain invited Pam to exhibit in the traveling Art exhibition "Switch on the Power" alongside Yoko Ono, Leigh Bowery, Warhol and Kraftwerk.

This allowed her to return to the video medium, producing and directing two promos incorporating her clothes and music. She cast a host of friends including Siouxsie Sioux and Alison Mosshart from the Kills to appear alongside her in the new twin collections inspired by shiny metals and reflective surfaces. The resulting videos 'Opal Eyes' and 'Electricman' were viewed by a whole new unexpected audience via YouTube and Myspace as well as the exhibition itself. This direct access and exposure regenerated a newfound interest in Pam's work and pushed the cat suit back into the spotlight resulting in media attention from magazines including

In 2007, Kylie Minogue appeared in Hogg's black mesh metal studded cat suit in her "2 Hearts" video, and Siouxsie Sioux wore numerous distinctive Pam Hogg signature cat suits throughout her 2008 tour and appearance on Later with Jools Holland. During the show, Pam was interviewed and announced her imminent return to fashion. 
In October 2008, the prestigious Fashion store Browns of South Molton St London, was the first to stock the new Hogg-Couture collection. She was further asked to dress their windows for Halloween, an honour rarely given to one designer.

In April 2013 Hogg was honoured during "Britweek", for her achievements. In Los Angeles. Pam was given a Fashion Show, the models included Lady Victoria Hervey. The show called "Opfashart" was part of an art installation, consisting of British Artists from Los Angeles and London. This included artists Duggie Fields and The Head of BAFTA, in Los Angeles, Nigel Daly, hosted by the artist and writer Amanda Eliasch, with Lisa Zane singing opera with Charles Eliasch. In October the same year she won The Creative Excellence prize from The Scottish Council.

A 2014 exhibition at the Victoria and Albert Museum, featured Hogg's dresses designed for Lady Mary Charteris was shown.

Hogg's collections have since been worn by an entire new generation of celebrities including Lady Gaga, Jessie J, Kelly Rowland, Tyra Banks, Alice Dellal, Jamie Winstone, Björk, Rihanna, Daisy Lowe, Lily Allen, Peaches Geldof, Naomi Campbell and Claudia Schiffer. In February 2011 Kate Moss, the day after London Fashion Week wore a Hogg black leather dress to the NME Awards on the same night as Alison Mosshart, wearing a Pam Hogg fur coat, picked up the prize for Hottest Woman, "Toni and Guy".

Hogg designed the trophies for the 2016 Brit Awards.

References

External links 

Scottish fashion designers
British women fashion designers
Living people
Year of birth missing (living people)
Alumni of the Glasgow School of Art
Alumni of the Royal College of Art
People from Paisley, Renfrewshire
BRIT Award trophy designers